Alain Peyrefitte (26 August 1925 – 27 November 1999) was a French scholar and politician. He was a confidant of Charles de Gaulle and had a long career in public service, serving as a diplomat in Germany and Poland. Peyrefitte is remembered for his support for partitioning Algeria amid the Algerian War.

Peyrefitte served as Minister of Information from 1962 to 1966, establishing the rules of presidential debates between the two electoral rounds; and as Minister of Justice from 1977 to 1981, being involved in the affair surrounding the mysterious death of Robert Boulin in 1979.

He became a member of the Académie française in 1977.

On 15 December 1986, he survived an assassination attempt by members of Action Directe (AD) in front of his house. The driver of his car was killed in the bomb attack.

Upon his death in 1999 he was honored by burial in Les Invalides which also houses the tomb of Napoleon and other revered national leaders.

Books
He wrote The Immobile Empire and Quand la Chine s'éveillera… le monde tremblera. Outside France he is probably best known for his book Le Mal Français (translated as The Trouble with France), which addresses the question of whether there is something unique to the French character that has caused some of the country's peculiar recurring problems. The book places his own observations and experiences as a journalist and government minister inside a panoramic view of French and European history from the medieval to the modern era.

Political career
Governmental functions
 Secretary of State for Information : April–September 1962.
 Minister of Returnees : September–November 1962.
 Minister of Information : 1962–1966.
 Minister of Scientific Research and Atomic Questions and Space : 1966–1967.
 Minister of Education : 1967–1968.
 Minister for Administrative Reforms : 1973–1974.
 Minister of Cultural Affairs and the Environment : March–May 1974.
 Keeper of the seals, Minister of Justice : 1977–1981.

Electoral mandates

National Assembly of France

Member of the National Assembly of France for Seine-et-Marne : 1958–1962 (Became secretary of State in 1962) / Reelected in 1967, but he stays minister / 1968–1973 (Became minister in 1973) / 1974–1977 (Became minister in 1977) / Reelected in 1978, but he stays minister / 1981–1995 (Became senator in 1995). Elected in 1958, reelected in 1962, 1967, 1968, 1973, 1974, 1978, 1981, 1986, 1988, 1993.

Senate of France

 Senator of Seine-et-Marne : 1995–1999 (He died in 1999). Elected in 1995.

General Council

 Vice-president of the General council of Seine-et-Marne : 1982–1988.
 General councillor of Seine-et-Marne : 1964–1988. Reelected in 1970, 1976, 1982.

Municipal Council

 Mayor of Provins : 1965–1997 (Resignation in 1997). Reelected in 1971, 1977, 1983, 1989, 1995.
 Municipal councillor of Provins : 1965–1999 (He died in 1999). Reelected in 1971, 1977, 1983, 1989, 1995.

Honours 
  : Commander of the Order of Cultural Merit (November 1999)
  : Commandeurs of the Ordre des Arts et des Lettres in September 1974

Works
Non-fiction, except when noted.
 1946: Rue d'Ulm, chroniques de la vie normalienne.
 1947: Le Sentiment de confiance
 1948: Les Roseaux froissés, novel
 1949: Le Mythe de Pénélope
 1961: Faut-il partager l'Algérie ?
 1973: Quand la Chine s'éveillera… le monde tremblera
 1976: Le Mal français (The Trouble with France)
 1981: Les Chevaux du lac Ladoga - la justice entre les extrêmes
 1983: Quand la rose se fanera
 1985: Encore un effort, Monsieur le Président
 1989: L'Empire immobile ou le choc des mondes (The Immobile Empire), historic novel
 1990: La Tragédie chinoise
 1995: La Société de confiance
 1995: Du Miracle en économie, lectures at Collège de France
 1997: La Chine s'est éveillée
 1994-2000: ''C'était de Gaulle

References

 Alain Peyrefitte (1993) The collision of two civilisations: the British expedition to China in 1792–4, London: Harvill, 

1925 births
1999 deaths
People from Aveyron
Mayors of places in Île-de-France
Politicians from Occitania (administrative region)
Union for the New Republic politicians
Union of Democrats for the Republic politicians
Rally for the Republic politicians
French Ministers of Justice
French Ministers of Culture
Ministers of Information of France
French Ministers of National Education
Deputies of the 1st National Assembly of the French Fifth Republic
Deputies of the 2nd National Assembly of the French Fifth Republic
Deputies of the 3rd National Assembly of the French Fifth Republic
Deputies of the 4th National Assembly of the French Fifth Republic
Deputies of the 5th National Assembly of the French Fifth Republic
Deputies of the 6th National Assembly of the French Fifth Republic
Deputies of the 7th National Assembly of the French Fifth Republic
Deputies of the 8th National Assembly of the French Fifth Republic
Deputies of the 9th National Assembly of the French Fifth Republic
Deputies of the 10th National Assembly of the French Fifth Republic
French Senators of the Fifth Republic
Senators of Seine-et-Marne
French anti-communists
École Normale Supérieure alumni
École nationale d'administration alumni
Members of the Académie Française
Members of the Académie des sciences morales et politiques
Commanders of the Order of Cultural Merit (Monaco)
Commandeurs of the Ordre des Arts et des Lettres
Commandeurs of the Ordre des Palmes Académiques
Chevaliers of the Légion d'honneur
Deaths from cancer in France